Peter Ian Burgoyne (born 11 November 1993) is an English cricketer and darts player. He played for Derbyshire County Cricket Club as an all-rounder who bowled right-arm off spin, and batted right-handed. He made his debut for the county in the 2011 Clydesdale Bank 40 against Middlesex in August 2011.

Burgoyne began playing darts within the British Darts Organisation, winning the 2017 Latvia Open pairs. He began playing the Professional Darts Corporation Challenge Tour in 2022, reaching the final of the fourth event.

References

External links
 

1993 births
Living people
Cricketers from Nottingham
English cricketers
Derbyshire cricketers
Southern Rocks cricketers
Sussex cricketers
English darts players
Professional Darts Corporation associate players